Bandits of the Badlands is a 1945 American Western film directed by Thomas Carr and written by Doris Schroeder. The film stars Sunset Carson, Peggy Stewart, Si Jenks, John Merton, Forrest Taylor and Wade Crosby. The film was released on September 14, 1945, by Republic Pictures.

Plot

Cast  
Sunset Carson as Sunset Carson
Peggy Stewart as Hallie Wayne
Si Jenks as Banty Jones 
John Merton as Cort McKinnon
Forrest Taylor as Pop Wayne
Wade Crosby as Burl Kohler
Jack Ingram as Ed McKinnon
Monte Hale as Dr. Steve Carson
Fred Graham as Henchman Duke Lee
Alan Ward as Captain Burke
Robert J. Wilke as Henchman Keller 
Tex Terry as Ranger Blackie
Jack O'Shea as Ranger Red

References

External links 
 

1945 films
American Western (genre) films
1945 Western (genre) films
Republic Pictures films
Films directed by Thomas Carr
American black-and-white films
1940s English-language films
1940s American films